That Brewster Boy is an American old-time radio situation comedy. It was broadcast on NBC from September 8, 1941, to March 2, 1942, and on CBS from March 4, 1942, to March 2, 1945. It was also carried on 13 stations in Canada.

Overview

That Brewster Boy focused on Jim and Jane Brewster (a prominent couple in a small town), their mischievous son, Joey, and their teenage daughter, Nancy. Joey often found himself in trouble that had been instigated by his friend Chuck. Other characters who were often heard were Phil Hayworth (Nancy's boyfriend), Herbert Clark (who was also fond of Nancy) and Miss Edmond (Joey's English teacher). Quaker Oats sponsored the program on both networks.

A review of the premiere episode in the trade publication Billboard praised the actors and the overall program, saying, "Script is excellently written and capably interpreted and abounds in clever comedy."

Personnel

Marvin Miller was the announcer, and Glenn Welty provided the music. Owen Vinson was the director, while Louis Scofield and Pauline Hopkins were writers.

References

External links

Logs
Log of selected episodes of That Brewster Boy from Jerry Haendiges Vintage Radio Logs
Log of selected episodes of That Brewster Boy from Old Time Radio Researchers Group

Streaming
Recordings of selected episodes of That Brewster Boy from Dumb.com
Recordings of selected episodes of That Brewster Boy from Old Time Radio Researchers Group

1940s American radio programs
1941 radio programme debuts
1945 radio programme endings
CBS Radio programs
NBC radio programs
American comedy radio programs